Yoyang Ja clan was one of the Korean clans. Their Bon-gwan was in Liaoyang, Liaoning, China. According to the research in 2000, the number of Yoyang Ja clan was 85. Their founder was  who was from Jingzhou in China.  died in the war against Mongolia in 1557. Then, Ja Hong seon immigrated to Kilju County with his sons named Ja Gyeong bo, Ja Sun jik, Ja Sun hui, and Ja Gyeong jo in order to avoid conflicts. Finally, Ja Hong seon founded Yoyang Ja clan and made Liaoyang their Bon-gwan where he used to live.

See also 
 Korean clan names of foreign origin

References

External links 
 

 
Korean clan names of Chinese origin